Jan Smit (born 8 April 1948) is a Dutch paleontologist. He was affiliated with the Faculty of Earth and Life Sciences at the Vrije Universiteit Amsterdam from 2003 to 2013 as a professor of event stratigraphy, studying rapid changes in the geological record related to mass extinctions.

Career 
Smit graduated from the University of Amsterdam in 1974 with a master's degree in geology. In 1981 he obtained his PhD (cum laude) at the same university.

Smit's main area of research is on the Cretaceous–Paleogene extinction event, which ended the Cretaceous period and killed all non-avian dinosaurs. He was an early researcher into the now-accepted belief that an asteroid impact was responsible for their demise; his dissertation, titled "A Catastrophic Event at the Cretaceous–Tertiary Boundary", was related to Luis and Walter Alvarez's recently published theory on the extinction event. Luis Alvarez described Smit as "a KT [Cretaceous–Tertiary] expert [who] has studied more KT sites around the world than anyone else". In 2019 The New Yorker labelled Smit as a "world authority" on the impact and extinction event.

Personal life 
Smit's daughter is Renske Smit, a researcher at the Astrophysics Research Institute at Liverpool John Moores University in Liverpool, England. She is one of only a handful of UK-based astronomers in the core survey teams of the James Webb Space Telescope. Smit's son-in-law is Robert Crain, a professor of theoretical astrophysics at the same university.

Awards 
In 2016 he was awarded the Van Waterschoot van der Gracht Medal.

A main-belt asteroid, 19140 Jansmit, is named after Smit.

References

1948 births
Dutch paleontologists
University of Amsterdam alumni
Living people
Barringer Medal winners